Paraburkholderia caribensis is a species of Pseudomonadota. The specific name caribensis refers to the Caribbean Islands, where the bacterium was first found.

References

External links
 Burkholderia J.P. Euzéby: List of Prokaryotic names with Standing in Nomenclature—Genus Burkholderia

caribensis
Bacteria described in 1999